Marcellin College may refer to:
Marcellin College, Bulleen, Victoria, Australia
Marcellin College Randwick, New South Wales, Australia
Marcellin College, Auckland, New Zealand